This is a listing of discography from Krystal Meyers.

Studio albums

Singles

Music videos
"Anticonformity" (2005)
"Fire" (2005)
"The Beauty of Grace" (2006)
"Hallelujah" (2007)
"Make Some Noise" (2008)
"Shine" (2009)

Non-album contributions
 "King of Angels (Feat. Josh Brown)" - from Come Let Us Adore Him

Dance Praise
Krystal Meyers currently has 4 songs featured in the Dance Praise series.

References

Meyers, Krystal

Pop music discographies
Meyers, Krystal